Parliamentary elections were held in Portugal on 25 November 1900. The result was a victory for the Regeneration Party, which won 104 seats.

Results

The results exclude seats from overseas territories.

References

Legislative elections in Portugal
Portugal
1900 elections in Portugal
November 1900 events